Wu Tze-cheng, sometimes transliterated Wu Ze-Cheng, (born 15 December 1945) is a Taiwanese politician and the last Governor of Taiwan Province.

Education
Wu obtained his master's degree in Construction Engineering and Management from National Central University.

Yilan County Government
On 14 October 2015, Deputy Magistrate Wu, representing Yilan County Government, held a talk with Deputy Mayor Lin Chin-rong, representing Taipei City Government, at Taipei City Hall in Taipei on the collaboration between the county and the city on the railways, public bus services and terminals, traffic congestion reduction on Freeway 5 and the spiritual relocation of Chiang Wei-shui.

References

External links
 

1945 births
Living people
Chairpersons of the Taiwan Provincial Government
Magistrates of Yilan County, Taiwan